Zhaozhou is a town in and the seat of Zhaozhou County in southwestern Heilongjiang province, China. , it has 11 residential communities and 7 villages under its administration. It is serviced by China National Highway 203.

References 

Township-level divisions of Heilongjiang